The 1967 World Fencing Championships were held in Montreal, Quebec, Canada. The event took place from July 5 to July 16, 1967.

Medal table

Medal summary

Men's events

Women's events

References

World Fencing Championships
F
1967 in Canadian sports
Sports competitions in Montreal
July 1967 sports events in Canada
1960s in Montreal
1967 in Quebec
1967 in fencing